Metopium or poisonwood is a genus of flowering plants in the sumac family, Anacardiaceae. They are dioecious trees with poisonous sap that can induce contact dermatitis.

Taxonomy

Species

, Plants of the World online has 4 accepted species: 

Metopium brownei (Jacq.) Urb. — black poisonwood
Metopium gentlei 
Metopium toxiferum (L.) Krug & Urb. — Florida poisonwood
Metopium venosum (Griseb.) Engl. — Cuban poisonwood

References

External links

Anacardiaceae
Anacardiaceae genera
Dioecious plants